The Pocket Athletic Conference (PAC) is a high school athletic conference in Southwestern Indiana with its headquarters at Forest Park.  Most of the conference's 13 members are mainly Class 2A and 3A public high schools currently located in Daviess, Dubois, Gibson, Perry, Pike, Posey, Spencer, and Warrick counties. Only one, Tecumseh, is a 1A and as such operates its football program independently of the PAC and remains independent in the sport, playing schools much closer to its size than its much larger borderline 3A, 3A, or 4A fellow members.

History
The Pocket Athletic Conference was established in 1938 with nine founding schools:  Cannelton, Chrisney, Lynnville, Mount Vernon, Owensville, Petersburg, Poseyville, Rockport, and Tell City. Seven of the nine original schools remain members in some form today. Cannelton left in 1971 and is now an independent.  Mount Vernon left in 1959 to join the Southern Indiana Athletic Conference then a member of the Big Eight Conference before returning to the conference in 2020. With the exception of Washington and Pike Central, all members are located within counties along the western end of the Interstate 64 corridor within Indiana.

The first current member appeared in 1958 when Poseyville consolidated with Cynthiana, Griffin, and Wadesville to form North Posey. Rockport merged with Richland in 1965 to form South Spencer. Elberfeld merged with former member Lynnville in 1965 to form Tecumseh. Also in 1965, Oakland City and Francisco, both of which joined the PAC in 1939, joined to become Wood Memorial. Dale, which had joined in 1939, joined with another former member, Chrisney, to form Heritage Hills in 1972. Huntingburg joined the PAC in 1970 from the SIAC and in 1972 consolidated with Holland to become Southridge. In 1974, Owensville consolidated with Fort Branch and Haubstadt into Gibson Southern. Both Fort Branch and Owensville were members of the PAC at the time. Haubstadt was also briefly a member of the PAC. That same year Petersburg joined with Winslow, Otwell, and Stendal to form Pike Central.

Gibson Southern left the PAC in 1979 when the Big Eight Conference was formed, only to return in 1994. In 2000, Wood Memorial left the PAC and is now a member of the Blue Chip Conference. Tell City, which had left in 1953, rejoined in 2001, also came back from the Big Eight Conference but also from the Southern Indiana Athletic Conference. In 2007, Forest Park, located in Ferdinand, officially joined the PAC from the Blue Chip Conference increasing the number of members back to the original nine.

The conference expanded to thirteen members in 2020, as they accepted former members Boonville and Mount Vernon, as well as Princeton, whose component school, Mount Olympus, was a member from 1939 to 1965, and complete newcomer Washington, all from the now extinct Big Eight Conference. In all, the PAC will inherit six of the original Big Eight members with the other two joining the SIAC.

Since 2000, the PAC has been represented in the state finals seven times. The three schools that have represented the PAC recently are Heritage Hills (2000 3A State Champs, and 2004 3A Runner-up), Southridge (2002 and 2006 2A Runner-up and again in 2018 and 2019) and North Posey (2005 2A Runner-up).

Forest Park, Southridge and Tecumseh have four state titles in both boys and girls basketball. Forest Park and Gibson Southern add three more state runner-up titles to the pool to make seven appearances at the state finals, not counting Tecumseh's appearance in the Tournament of Champions. Forest Park, Gibson Southern, North Posey, Southridge, and Tecumseh have all been ranked within the last eight years in either girls or boys basketball, sometimes both. In 1999, Tecumseh lost by six points in the experimental "Tournament of Champions" to the 4A State Champion, Indianapolis' North Central. Tecumseh was the 1A State Champion. Boonville and Washington bring additional strength on the conference's basketball schedule as well as two more of the state's largest gymnasiums.

The Pocket Athletic Conference has been exceptionally strong in baseball and softball in the last 20 years. Both South Spencer and Gibson Southern won the softball state title in their respective classes in 2015. Forest Park also won the title in 2001. North Posey ('05, '06) and South Spencer ('07, '13, '15) have won state titles in baseball. As a result, South Spencer, a AA school, plays in the AAA tournament, and Gibson Southern, a AAA school, plays in the AAAA tournament, where the Titans have made consecutive appearances at the AAAA Semi-State match, preventing their return to AAA. In 2022, Gibson Southern returned to class AAA, following two seasons losing at the regional level. Likewise Tecumseh, having moved up to class AA after a state title and semi state appearance, has advanced to the AA Semi-State joining Gibson Southern in playing in a Semi State in a higher class  only after beating conference rival Southridge in the regional. Southridge will also move up into AAA from AA in baseball after back-to-back State Runner-up titles.

In the last ten years, 29 Pocket Athletic Conference teams have represented their school and the conference in state championship games.

New inter conference County Rivals
Already containing two sets of two county rivals; Dubois County rivals Forest Park and Southridge, as well as Spencer County sole rivals Heritage Hills and South Spencer, the conference will add two more in 2020 in football; Posey County sole rivals Mount Vernon and North Posey and Gibson County rivals Gibson Southern and Princeton plus another in all other sports; Warrick County rivals Boonville and Tecumseh. In all cases except Southridge and Forest Park and Gibson Southern and Princeton, the rivals will compete in separate divisions.

Member schools

Current members (13)

 Gibson Southern competed in the Big Eight Conference from 1980 to 1994 before rejoining the PAC.
 Tecumseh is a 1A independent school in football.
 Tell City played in the Southern Indiana Athletic Conference from 1953 to 1980, then played in the Big Eight Conference 1980–2001 before rejoining.
 Due to Gibson Southern making back-to-back appearances at the state finals, Gibson Southern and defending 2014 state champ and 2015 runner-up Leo High School from the Allen County Athletic Conference will move up to Class AAAA for 2 years because of the IHSAA's Tournament Success Factor. Gibson Southern, due to making back to back appearances in the AAAA Semi-State, will remain in class AAAA in softball until 2019, provided that they do not continue to advance to the Semi-State. To date neither school has returned to AAA.
 South Spencer advances to AAA for 2 years in Baseball also because of the IHSAA's Tournament Success Factor.
 Tecumseh advanced to AA also due to the IHSAA's Tournament Success Factor

 Shaded schools operate on Eastern Time. The rest operate on Central Time.

Former members

 Concurrent with Perry CC 1938-62.
 Concurrent with Spencer CC: Chrisney 1938-59; Rockport 1938-65; Dale 1939-65.
 Concurrent with Warrick CC: Tecumseh 1938-59; Boonville 1939-41.
 Concurrent with Posey CC: Mount Vernon 1938-49; Poseyville 1938-58.
 Concurrent with Gibson CC: Owensville 1938-49; Fort Branch, Francisco, Mount Olympus, Oakland City 1939-49.
 Concurrent with Pike CC Petersburg 1938-49; Winslow 1939-40

  Schools that operate on Eastern Time.
 As of 2012-13, Princeton plays in a new 5,200 seat gym which replaced the aging 3,000 seat old gym which is still occasionally used for tourneys as of 2016.

Membership timeline

Sponsored Sports

1As of the 2008-09 school year Tecumseh will play football as an independent. They will remain in the PAC for all other sports.

22 State Titles, however Tell City's football title was won under the Big Eight Conference.

Sectional and Regional numbers include titles won by the nine schools' predecessors, but do not include those who left, i.e. Cannelton, Mount Vernon, and Wood Memorial or their predecessors.

Divisions
Due to the PAC inheriting the remains of the Big Eight Conference, the PAC will split into two divisions. These divisions will affect every sport except Archery, Cross Country, Swimming and Diving, Track and Field, and Wrestling, which have no IHSAA class divisions.

State championships
Boonville Pioneers (2)
2006 Softball (3A) 2
2021 Softball (3A)

Forest Park Rangers (5)
2001 Softball (A) 1
2005 Boys Basketball (2A) 1
2006 Boys Basketball (2A) 1
2022 Girls Basketball (2A)
2023 Girls Basketball (2A)

Gibson Southern Titans (4)
2003 Softball (2A)
2005 Softball (3A)
2015 Softball (3A)
2021 Football (3A)

Heritage Hills Patriots (1)
2000 Football (3A)

Mount Vernon Wildcats (0)

North Posey Vikings (2)
2005 Baseball (2A)
2006 Baseball (2A)

Pike Central Chargers (0)

Princeton Community Tigers (2)
 2009 Boys' Basketball (3A) 2
 2015 Girls' Basketball (3A) 2

Southridge Raiders (3)
1998 Girls Basketball (2A)
2017 Football (2A)
2021 Baseball (3A)

South Spencer Rebels (5)
2007 Baseball (2A)
2011 Baseball (2A)
2013 Baseball (2A)
2014 Softball (2A)
2015 Baseball (2A)

Tecumseh Braves (7)
1999 Boys Basketball (A)
2003 Baseball (A)
2009 Softball (A)
2011 Softball (A)
2017 Softball (A)
2022 Girls Basketball (A)
2022 Softball (A)

Tell City Marksmen (0)

Washington Hatchets (9)
1914 Boys' Track
1915 Boys' Track
1930 Boys' Basketball
1941 Boys' Basketball
1942 Boys' Basketball
2005 Boys' Basketball (3A) 2
2008 Boys' Basketball (3A) 2
2010 Boys' Basketball (3A) 2
2011 Boys' Basketball (3A) 2

Former Member State Titles
Cannelton Bulldogs (0)

Wood Memorial Trojans (1)
 2017 Girls' Basketball (A)

State Runner-Up Titles
Forest Park Rangers (4)
1999 Girls Basketball (2A) 1
2003 Boys Basketball (2A) 1
2018 Boys Basketball (2A)
2022 Girls Basketball (2A)

Gibson Southern Titans (6)
2001 Girls Softball (2A)
2002 Girls Basketball (3A)
2013 Boys Soccer (1A)
2013 Girls Soccer (1A)
2014 Girls Softball (3A)
2014 Boys Baseball (3A)

Heritage Hills Patriots (2)
2005 Football (3A)
2019 Football (3A)

North Posey Vikings (2)
2005 Football (2A)
2007 Softball (2A)

Pike Central Chargers (1)
1990 Softball

Southridge Raiders (4)
1982 Football (A)
1998 Girls Basketball Tournament of Champions
2002 Football (2A)
2006 Football (2A)
2018 Baseball (2A)
2019 Baseball (2A)
South Spencer Rebels (2)
1988 Football (2A)
1999 Softball (2A)

Tecumseh Braves (5)
1999 Boys Basketball Tournament of Champions
2002 Baseball (A)
2003 Softball (A)
2007 Softball (A)
2008 Softball (A)
2010 Baseball (A)
Tell City Marksmen (1)
1986 Football (2A) 2

1Occurred when Forest Park was a member of the Blue Chip Conference.

2Occurred as a member of the Big Eight Conference.

PAC titles

News and facts
 2008 was the first season since 1996 that Heritage Hills solidly lost the PAC title. North Posey, and Southridge shared the title that year.
Southridge's home gymnasium in Huntingburg has a capacity of 6,092 and is one of the 20 largest in Indiana. Boonville and Washington add two more of the state's largest  gymnasiums

Alumni
Gil Hodges, Petersburg – Class of 1941.  Longtime member of the Brooklyn Dodgers, manager of the 1969 New York "Miracle" Mets.  Also the greatest snub in the history of the Baseball Hall of Fame.
Bill Feix, Tell City – Class of 1950, 2-year letterman, Captain, Vanderbilt Basketball team.
Burke Scott, Tell City – Class of 1951, 2x All-PAC basketball player, was a starter on Indiana University's 1953 NCAA title team.
Roger Kaiser, Dale – Class of 1957, Georgia Tech All-American, led the Dale Golden Aces to PAC Basketball titles in the 1954–55 (SO) and in 1956–57 (SR) seasons.
Bob Reinhart, Dale – Class of 1957, future Georgia State MBB Coach was a teammate of Kaiser and led the Dale Golden Aces to PAC Basketball titles in the 1954–55 (SO) and in 1956–57 (SR) seasons.
Del Harris, future NBA Coach, was the Dale Golden Aces Head Coach during the 1961–62 and 1962-63 seasons.
Tim Barrett, Pike Central – Class of 1979, Major League Baseball player, Montreal Expos
Bruce King, Heritage Hills – Class of 1981, NFL Running Back, 1984–1987
Terry Brahm, Heritage Hills – Class of 1981; 1988 Olympian; NCAA & Big Ten Champion track athlete
Ken Dilger, Heritage  Hills - Class of 1989, Super Bowl Champion Tight End, led Heritage Hills to PAC Football titles in the 1987 (JR) and 1988 (SR) seasons; Ken was also a star baseball and basketball player, helping Heritage Hills to baseball titles in 1987 and 1988; and basketball titles in 1987-88 and 1988-89.
Parrish Casebier, South Spencer - Class of 1989, Basketball star at University of Evansville. Casebier also spent several years in South American professional leagues.
Alex Graman, Southridge – Class of 1996, Major League pitcher, New York Yankees
Mitch Stetter, Southridge – Class of 1999, Major League pitcher, Milwaukee Brewers, Los Angeles Angels of Anaheim
Jon Goldsberry, Heritage Hills – Class of 2000, Purdue Boilermakers, NFL Fullback 
Jay Cutler - Heritage Hills - Class of 2001, former Chicago Bears quarterback, starred in high school football at Heritage Hills and led them to the 3A state title in 2000 (SR) and PAC titles in his three years as Varsity Starter (1998–2000).
Ben Braunecker - Forest Park - Class of 2012, former Chicago Bears tight end, starred in high school football & track at Forest Park; consensus All-American Tight End for Harvard.

Neighboring Conferences
Southern Indiana Athletic Conference
Blue Chip Conference
Patoka Lake Conference

See also
 Hoosier Hysteria
 Largest high school gyms in the United States

References

External links
 

 
Indiana high school athletic conferences
Southwestern Indiana
Education in Dubois County, Indiana
Education in Gibson County, Indiana
Education in Perry County, Indiana
Education in Pike County, Indiana
Education in Posey County, Indiana
Education in Spencer County, Indiana
Education in Warrick County, Indiana